Hubertus "Huub" Lambriex (born 27 February 1960 in Bussum) is a sailor from the Netherlands, who represented his country at the 1984 Summer Olympics in Los Angeles. With Willy van Bladel as helmsman, Lambriex took the 11th place in the Tornado.

Professional life
Lambriex studied at the Nyenrode University (1978–1982). After the Olympics Lambriex and Guido Alkemade started their own company, (1984) in yacht equipment, LA84, specialized in ropes. Lambriex left the company in 2001. Nowadays Lambriex is partner at Mentalent (2005 – Present) and CCO at Enzyscreen (2010 – Present).

Sources
 
 
 
 
 
 
 
 
 
 
 
 
 
 
 
 
 

1960 births
Living people
People from Bussum
Dutch male sailors (sport)

Sailors at the 1984 Summer Olympics – Tornado
Olympic sailors of the Netherlands
Sportspeople from North Holland